Dunster station is on the Canadian National Railway mainline in Dunster, British Columbia.  The station is served by Via Rail's Jasper–Prince Rupert train as a flag stop.

The original railway station was built by the Grand Trunk Pacific Railway and opened in 1913. The station and town was named by a railway inspector after his home-town of Dunster in England.

References

External links 
Via Rail Station Description
Pictures and info on Dunster train station

Via Rail stations in British Columbia
Railway stations in Canada opened in 1913
1913 establishments in British Columbia